Milan Holeček (born 23 October 1943) is a right-handed former professional tennis player from Czechoslovakia, who retired in 1976. He reached a career-high ranking of No. 71 in singles on 19 April 1974.

Career finals (Open Era)

Singles (1 win – 1 loss)

Singles (2 wins – 1 loss)

External links
 
 
 

Czech male tennis players
Czechoslovak male tennis players
Sportspeople from Pardubice
Living people
1943 births